Achanta Sharath Kamal (born 12 July 1982) is an Indian professional table tennis player. He is the first Indian table tennis player ever to become ten times Senior National Champion hence breaking the record of eight-time National Champion Kamlesh Mehta. In 2019 he was awarded the Padma Shri, India's fourth highest civilian award and in 2022, he was awarded the Khel Ratna Award, India's highest sporting honour.

His ITTF world ranking is 32 . He beat Joo Se Hyuk and Chuang Chih-yuan, world no. 8 and 16 respectively in 2015 28th Asian cup at Jaipur. Sharath won the men's singles gold in the 16th Commonwealth table tennis championship held at Kuala Lumpur in 2004. He is a recipient of the Arjuna award for the year 2004. He currently lives in Düsseldorf, Germany. Over the past few years he has been playing in the European league. After stints in Spain and Sweden, he is currently playing in the German Bundesliga for the club Borussia Düsseldorf.

He has won the US Open Table Tennis Men's championships held at Grand Rapids, Michigan in July 2010. During the course of the tournament he went on to defeat the defending champion Thomas Keinath of Slovakia in an epic battle of 7 games to win 4–3. In the same year he won the Egypt Open beating Li Ching of Hong Kong in straight sets 11–7, 11–9, 11–8, 11–4; thus becoming first Indian to win a singles title on the ITTF Pro Tour. He also captained the Indian men's team that won the team title at the same championship by defeating favourites and nine-time champions England.

He also won the gold medal at the 2006 Commonwealth Games in Melbourne, beating crowd favourite Australian William Henzell in the final, apart from helping the Indian team clinch gold in the table tennis team event against Singapore. He teamed up with Subhajit Saha to win the Men's Doubles gold at the 2010 Commonwealth Games in New Delhi. He won three medals in 2018 Commonwealth Games in Gold Coast, gold in men's team event with Anthony Amalraj, Harmeet Desai, Sathiyan Gnanasekaran & Sanil Shetty silver in men's doubles with Sathiyan Gnanasekaran & bronze in men's singles event.

He represented India in the 2004 Olympics in Athens and is still the top Indian TT player. He also represented the country in the 2006 Asian Games at Qatar.

In the year 2007 he was the first Indian to win the Pyongyang Invitational Tournament held at Pyongyang, North Korea. This was the 21st edition of the tournament which was held in August 2007. His best performance on the world circuit came in the Japan Pro Tour held in June 2007 where he beat World No.19, Lee Jung Woo (South Korea). After this victory he reached his career best ranking of World No. 73 and in January 2011 his ranking was 44. Incidentally, Sharath was also the only Indian Men's Table Tennis player to be selected for the Beijing Olympics in 2008.

In the season 2010–11 he also played in the German major league (Bundesliga) for TSV Gräfelfing and has been one of the best players in the league with wins over top German TT players. He played for SV Werder Bremen in the 2011–12 season. During 2012–13, he played in the Swedish league before returning to Germany in May 2013 to sign for Borussia Düsseldorf. Known as the "Rekordmeisters", Borussia Düsseldorf is one of the best clubs in Europe. Sharath and the team also won the Deutsche Pokal for the year 2013, a prestigious cup tournament in Germany. Currently the team is ranked second in the Bundesliga season 2013–14.

Sharath qualified for the 2016 Rio Olympics after beating Iran's Noshad Alamian in the Asian Olympic qualification. However, he made a first round exit in the men's individual event losing to Adrian Crișan of Romania.
He is an alumnus of PSBB Nungambakkam school (class of 2000) and Loyola College, Chennai. He is employed with the Indian Oil Corporation as an officer.

Early Life and Career 
Sharath was introduced to Table Tennis by his father at the age of 4. Sharath's father along with his uncle Muralidhar Rao taught him the technicalities of the game and groomed him to be a professional paddler. Both his father and uncle were state-level players and national-level coaches.

Sharath couldn't handle his mental attitude as he would always want to win rather than accept defeat. The defeat was something that he would often get frustrated at. His father and uncle helped him with mental conditioning. Sharath's uncle had made a strict rule for him to deal with his frustration. He had spent his time practicing Table Tennis with his uncle before and after school every day. At the age of 16, Sharath Kamal began his professional career and took part in state-level competitions. Sharath Kamal has been in top form since his foray into professional table tennis.

Domestic career 
After his success at state meets, Sharath advanced to the national level. He bagged a bronze at 2002 National Games of India in singles and mixed doubles events with Pradeera Thiruvengadam and a sliver medal in team event where in the gold medal match against Bengal he lost his match to Sourav Chakraborty 3-2(11-9, 8–11, 6–11, 11–2, 13–11).
Sharath Kamal lost in the final of the senior national championships in 2002. In 2003, Sharath became the National Champion for the first time at the National Table Tennis Championships. He again won the nationals in 2004. From 2006 to 2010, Kamal won the senior nationals five times consecutively. In 2007 nationals, Sharath made a clean sweep of 4 golds. He defeated Sourav Chakraborty in singles final. He and Subhajit Saha defeated Sourav Chakraborty and Anirban Nandi in doubles final. He won mixed doubles gold with Poulomi Ghatak by defeating Subhajit Saha and Nandita Saha. In team event his team PSPB defeated RSPB. In 2009, he again won team event and singles gold by defeating Sourav Chakraborty. He also clinched a bronze in doubles event with Subhajit Saha. He again won the singles title in 2010 nationals by defeating Soumyadeep Roy in a 7 games thrilling match. He also won gold in team event.

In 2011, he won the gold in team event. But he lost to Anthony Amalraj in singles final. In 2012, he lost to young Soumyajit Ghosh in finals of 74th senior nationals. But won the team event with PSPB. He lost to Harmeet Desai in semi-finals at 2013-14 nationals. But again managed to win team event. In 2015-16 nationals, he lost to Sathiyan Gnanasekaran in straight games in semi-finals. He defeated Sathiyan in 2018-19 nationals 4–3 to win his ninth national title becoming first player to do and surpassing legendary Kamlesh Mehta's record of 8 titles. He also won team event gold. But Sathiyan got his revenge  defeating him in final of 2020-21 nationals. Sharath won his 10th title in 2021-22 nationals by defeating Sathiyan in the singles final. In the match, he was trailing by 3-1 but came back from behind and won the match 4-3(7-11, 12–10, 9–11, 7–11, 12–10, 11–9, 11–6).

Professional career

2002: Early Breakthrough 
The national call-up finally came on the eve of the 2002 Commonwealth Games, where he was selected for a 16-member probables training camp. It was the break Sharath Kamal needed to launch his career at the age of 20. Although he was not selected for main squad the experience at the camp gave him confidence and the exposure to top-level players made him better. Sharath Kamal made it to the final of the senior national championships in 2002 and though he lost, he was soon drafted into the national team.

2003: World Championships Debut 
Sharath was selected for 2003 World Table Tennis Championships alongside Chetan Baboor and Sourav Chakraborty. This was his first world championships appearance and his first major tournament. He defeated Tahiti's Sylvain Motahu 11–3, 11–3, 11–4, 11–7 in the first group stage match. This was his first world championships win. He also won men's doubles first round match with Chetan Baboor defeating Santoago Coste and Hector Berrios of Puerto Rico 9–11, 11–7, 11–6, 11–4. But lost mixed doubles first round match with Pradeera Thiruuengadam to Indika Silva and Deepika Rodrigo of Sri Lanka 11–8, 10–12, 8–11, 11–9, 8–11.
He then scored a straight-games win over Lithuania's Arturas Orlovas, winning 11–4, 11–4, 13–11, 12–10 to qualify for main draw. He made a promising start against 57th ranked Christophe Legout of France as he won the opening game 11–2. But the Frenchman overcame the early hiccups to take the next four games 11–6, 11–6, 15–13, 11-6 comfortably to win the match 4-1 and end Sharath's campaign.

2004: Olympics, South Asian Games Debut and Commonwealth Championships Gold 
Sharath was selected for 2004 World Team Table Tennis Championships. India played in second division of the championship. In the first match against Slovenia he defeated S Ignjatovic 3-2(4-11 12-10 11-9 6-11 11–8) as India opened their account by defeating Slovenia 3–2. India lost their next match against Slovakia. In the next match against Portugal he easily won his match against João Monteiro in straight games 4-0(13-11, 11–7, 11–7) as India comfortably won the match 3–0. He defeated El-sayed Lashin 3-2(10-12, 3–11, 11–8, 15–13, 11–8) and S Diaa by 3-2(7-11, 11–9, 9–11, 11–8, 11–6) as India won the match by same margin against Egypt in last group stage match.

Sharath Kamal was selected to represent India at 2004 South Asian Games.
This was his South Asian Games debut. He won the team event gold as India thrashed Pakistan in the gold medal match 3–0. He opened his team's account by defeating Farjad Saif Khan in straight games after that his compatriots Subhajit Saha and Soumyadeep Roy completed the formalities to win the gold medal. He won the mixed doubles gold medal partnering Vishaka Vijay defeating compatriots Roy and Mantu Ghosh in the gold medal match 3-1(8-11, 11–7, 11–9, 11–10) in an all India final. He and Roy reached men's doubles final by defeating Sri Lankan duo Thilina Laknath and Indika Prasad 3-1(11-4, 11–4, 9–11, 11–7) in semi-finals. They defeated compatriots Subhajit Saha and Ranbir Das in an all Indian final. Sharath was denied a fourth gold in singles. He reached singles final by defeating Rajendra Kapali of Nepal and Piyadasa Thilina Laknath of Sri Lanka both in straight games. But lost to compatriot Soumyadeep Roy in the final. He lost the first game 11-9 but came back by winning next two games 11–9,11-7. Roy won the fourth game 11-6 and he won the fifth game 11-9 but Roy came back from behind winning next two games 11–5,11-4 to win the gold medal.

Sharath's first international singles gold medal came at the 2004 Commonwealth Table Tennis Championships where he won men's singles gold. He also won men's team event where his team defeated England 3–1 in the final. He qualified for 2004 Olympics which gave a new high in his career graph. At his Olympics debut he defeated Mohamed Sofiane Boudjadja of Algeria in first round in straight  games but bowed out in second round losing to Ko Lai Chak of Hong Kong in straight games.

2005 
Kamal competed at 2005 World Table Tennis Championships but lost to top seed and eventual world champion Wang Liqin in first round 4-1 but managed to take the third game 11–9. In the mixed doubles, he and Mamta Prabhu got a walkover from Bode Abiodun and Atisi Owoh of Nigeria in the first round. In the second, they were defeated by the Singaporean pair of Xiao Li Cai and Jia Wei Li.

2006: Commonwealth Games, South Asiad Golds and Asian Games 
Sharath made his Commonwealth Games debut at 2006 Commonwealth Games. He was the top seed in singles which gave him a bye to directly round of 32. He swept Jason Sugrue in first  round but dropped one game against Andrew Rushton and two games against Cai Xiaoli in next matches but still managed to win. He defeated Segun Toriola in straight games in semi-finals to reach the final. He won the gold medal by defeating William Henzell of Australia in the gold medal match 4–3 in a thrilling 40 minutes match. He became first Indian to win table tennis gold at commonwealth games. He also won the gold the medal in men's team event where his team defeated Singapore in the final 3–2. He lost his first match against Cai Xiaoli which reduced India 0–2 in the gold medal. But team India came back as Subhajit Saha won his match and Sharath won his second match against Yang Zi which levelled things at 2-2. Soumyadeep Roy sealed the match by winning his match against Cai Xiaoli. This was Indian team's first ever commonwealth gold. He partnered Soumyadeep Roy for men's doubles but lost in the quarter-finals to Andrew Baggaley and Andrew Rushton 3-2(8–11,12-10,7-11,11-6 and 4–11).

In December, Sharath made his Asian Games debut at 2006 Asian Games. He was 13th seed, received bye to Round of 32. He beat Đoàn Kiến Quốc of Vietnam 11–6,11-7,13-15,11-5,11-9 in round of 32. In doubles,Sharath bowed out in the pre-quarters losing to Chiang Peng-lung 5–11,5-11,8-11,4-11. He was ousted in round of 32 losing 9–11,9-11,9-11 losing to Vietnamese pair where he paired with Soumyadeep Roy. In the team event, He won two matches and lost two matches. Eventually, his team finished third in the group unable to advance any further.

2007 
In the year 2007 he was the first Indian to win the Pyongyang Invitational Tournament held at Pyongyang, North Korea. This was the 21st edition of the tournament which was held in August 2007. His best performance on the world circuit came in the Japan Pro Tour held in June 2007 where he beat World No.19, Lee Jung Woo (South Korea). In the world Championships, Sharath once again had a first round exit like his last appearance losing to seed no. 28 Polish Lucjan Błaszczyk 8–11,6-11,9-11,9-11. In the doubles event, he paired with Soumyadeep Roy and went on to beat Austrian pair of Stefan Fegerl and Werner Schlager 11–4,6-11,9-11,11-9,11-8. This was his first ever match win in world Championships, But lost in the second round to Serbian pair of Aleksandar Karakašević and Slobodan Grujić 12–10,11-5,11-6,11-3. In the mixed doubles event, he paired up with Poulomi Ghatak but lost in the first round to Xu Xin and Guo Yan 9–11,13-11,5-11,4-11 and 6–11.

2008 
Sharath qualified for 2008 Olympics. He beat Alfredo Carneros of Spain in first round 4–2. But lost to Chen Weixing of Austria 1–4.

2009

2010: 1st Pro Tour Title, Commonwealth Gold and Doubles Specialization with Subhajit Saha and Pro Tour Grand Finals

2013: World Cup

2018: Commonwealth and Asiad Success

2019: Best Career Ranking and Commonwealth Championships Golds

2020: 2nd Career Title 
Sharath won the 2020 ITTF Challenger Plus Oman Open men's singles title. He outclassed top seeded Marcos Freitas of Portugal 6–11, 11–8, 12–10, 11–9, 3–11, 17–15 in a 1 hour long final. This was his 1st title in 10 years.

2021: Olympics 3rd Round and Asian Championships Bronzes 
In March 2021, Sharath played at WTT Star Contender Doha, where he upset Patrick Franziska in the round of 32. But lost to Dimitrij Ovtcharov in next round in straight games 3–0.

2022 
He competed at the 1st ever wtt grand smash, the Singapore Smash 2022. He had a 1st round exit in singles after losing to Anton Källberg whereas in doubles he paired up Sathiyan Gnanasekaran but lost to Lim Jong-hoon and Jang Woo-jin 0–3. He bagged a bronze at WTT Contender  Doha 2022. Kamal faced upcoming Chinese Star Yuan Licen in the semi-finals which became a 1 hour long hard fought match which he eventually lost 4-3(5-11,11-8,6-11,11-7,11-5,10-12 and 9–11). On the day of his 40th birthday Kamal defeated Enzo Angles and Vitor Ishiy to qualify for the main draw of WTT Star Contender European Series. He then defeated Lubomir Pistej in straight games in first round but lost to 7th seed and world no.8 Darko Jorgic in straight games in next round.

40-year-old Sharath Kamal won his 4th medal at the [Commonwealth Games] in Birmingham when he defeated Liam Pitchford of England to win Gold in the Men's Singles table tennis category. Also, Sharath Kamal won Silver in Men's Doubles partnering with Sathiyan Gnanasekaran & another Gold in Mixed Doubles category with Sreeja Akula in Birmingham 2022.

Club career 
After playing for San Sebastian in the Spanish league for a while, he moved to the German Tischtennis-Bundesliga for TSV Gräfelfing in the 2010/2011 season. In March 2011 he played for the Bundesliga club SV Werder Bremen, which he left in 2012 for Italy to join the first division club Siracusa. However, since this dissolved and Sharath Kamal could not join a new club because the change period had expired, he kept fit as a non-club at the Trainingszentrum DTTZ in Düsseldorf. In 2013, Borussia Düsseldorf signed him for a year to replace Christian Süss, who was injured on a long-term basis, and became German champions several times with the team and cup winner. His contract with Düsseldorf was extended until 2017. For the season 2017/18 he moved to TTC Schwalbe Bergneustadt; he returned to Düsseldorf for the season 2018/19. His contract was again extended for 2022/23 season by Borussia Düsseldorf.

Commonwealth Games Medals

Commonwealth Games
13 medals – (7 gold, 3 silver, 3 bronze)

Asian Games
2 medals – (0 gold, 0 silver, 2 bronze)

Awards 
 2004: Arjun Award
 2019: Padma Shri
 2022: Khel Ratna Award

Records

See also
 Mamta Prabhu
 Poulomi Ghatak
 Mouma Das

References

External links
 
 
 
 

1982 births
Living people
Indian male table tennis players
Olympic table tennis players of India
Table tennis players at the 2004 Summer Olympics
Table tennis players at the 2008 Summer Olympics
Table tennis players at the 2016 Summer Olympics
Table tennis players at the 2020 Summer Olympics
Recipients of the Arjuna Award
Racket sportspeople from Chennai
Loyola College, Chennai alumni
Tamil sportspeople
Commonwealth Games gold medallists for India
Commonwealth Games silver medallists for India
Commonwealth Games bronze medallists for India
Table tennis players at the 2006 Commonwealth Games
Table tennis players at the 2010 Commonwealth Games
Table tennis players at the 2014 Commonwealth Games
Table tennis players at the 2018 Commonwealth Games
Table tennis players at the 2022 Commonwealth Games
Commonwealth Games medallists in table tennis
Table tennis players at the 2006 Asian Games
Table tennis players at the 2010 Asian Games
Table tennis players at the 2014 Asian Games
Table tennis players at the 2018 Asian Games
Asian Games medalists in table tennis
Asian Games bronze medalists for India
Medalists at the 2018 Asian Games
Padma Seshadri Bala Bhavan schools alumni
Recipients of the Padma Shri in sports
Recipients of the Khel Ratna Award
Medallists at the 2010 Commonwealth Games
Medallists at the 2014 Commonwealth Games
Medallists at the 2018 Commonwealth Games
Medallists at the 2022 Commonwealth Games